Colin Escott (born 31 August 1949) is a British music historian and author specializing in  early U.S. rock and roll and country music. His works include a biography of Hank Williams, histories of Sun Records and The Grand Ole Opry, liner notes for more than 500 albums and compilations, and major contributions to stage and television productions. Honors include multiple Grammy Awards and a Tony Award nomination.

Career
His early career included stints in operations for Island Records and Polygram Records in the 1970s, followed by independent work for Universal, Sony/Columbia, Warner Bros.-Rhino, Time Life, Capitol-EMI, RCA, and many independent companies, including Bear Family, Sundazed, and Omnivore.
He also wrote music history pieces for various music industry publications including Record Mirror, Goldmine, and Record Hunter.

Described as "the foremost authority on Sun Records", in 1992 he and Martin Hawkins published Good Rockin’ Tonight: Sun Records and the Birth of Rock ‘n’ Roll, the first in-depth account of the label's history. His 1994 book Hank Williams: The Biography was adapted into the 2015 movie I Saw the Light. The multi-CD box set, The Complete Hank Williams, won a 1998 Grammy, and another of his productions, Hank Williams: The Garden Spot Programs, 1950, won a 2014 Grammy. 

In 1999 he received a Lifetime Achievement Award from the Association for Recorded Sound Collections. In 2011 he was recognized with the Charlie Lamb Award for Excellence in Country Music Journalism.

Escott co-wrote the 2010 musical theater production Million Dollar Quartet, which received three Tony nominations, and in 2020 wrote a sequel, Million Dollar Quartet Christmas. He was also part of the writing/producing team adapting the original show for CMT/Viacom for broadcast in 2017.

In 2022 he was tapped as a writer for the "audio adventure" podcast series Tennessee Music Pathways. That same year, he and co-writer Peter Guralnick released "an epic hardcover book", The Birth of Rock 'n' Roll: The Illustrated Story of Sun Records and the 70 Recordings That Changed the World, in conjunction with the film Elvis.

Middle Tennessee State University's Center for Popular Music houses the Colin Escott Collection of historical documents and photographs acquired in 2019.

Books

Author

Co-author

Other works

Theater
Co-writer, Million Dollar Quartet (2010)
Writer, Million Dollar Quartet Christmas (2020)

Film
Screenwriter, Let Freedom Sing: Music That Inspired the Civil Rights Movement (2009)

Television
Consultant, Lost Highway: The Story of Country Music (BBC, 2003)
Executive producer, Hank Williams: Honky Tonk Blues (PBS, American Masters, 2004)
Writer, producer, Sun Records (CMT, 2017)
Consultant, Country Music (PBS, 2019)

Articles and essays
Selected works from books and major music industry publications:

"Memphis Blues: Sun Rise". Record Mirror. November 13, 1971
"Carl Perkins: 'Blue Suede Shoes'". The History of Rock, 1981
"Bill Justis: Raunchy by Choice". Goldmine. June 15, 1990
"Bill Haley: Indisputably the First". Goldmine. April 19, 1991
"Hi Records: That Memphis Beat". Record Hunter. July 1991
"B.B. King: The Fortunate Son". Goldmine. April 29, 1994
"Tim Hardin: Poet of the Interior". Goldmine. June 24, 1994
"Ian and Sylvia: Northern Journey". Goldmine. July 8, 1994
"The Big Bopper (J.P. Richardson)", "Floyd Cramer", "Johnny Horton", "Billy Walker". The Encyclopedia of Country Music. 1997
"Come On, Let's Go!: Elvis on the Hayride". Mojo. December 2004

Selected production credits
Producer credits on major LP and CD releases:

Elvis Presley: The Definitive Collection (Sony BMG, 2006)
The Ike & Tina Turner Story: 1960–1975 (Time/Life, 2007)
Kenny Rogers: The Greatest Duets (Time/Life, 2009)
Waylon Jennings:	Goin' Down Rockin': The Last Recordings (Time/Life, 2012)
George Jones: Heartaches and Hangovers (Time/Life, 2012)
George Jones: The Great Lost Hits (Time/Life, 2012)
Dim Lights, Thick Smoke and Hillbilly Music: Volumes 1-10 (Bear Family, 2011-2013)
The Everly Brothers: Songs Our Daddy Taught Us (reissue) (Bear Family, 2013)
The Sun Rock Box, The Sun Blues Box, The Sun Country Box (Bear Family, 2013)
Jerry Lee Lewis: The Knox Phillips Sessions (Ace, Time/Life, 2014)
Truckers, Kickers, Cowboy Angels: The Blissed-Out Birth of Country Rock, Volumes 1-5 (Bear Family, 2014-2015)
Big Joe Turner: The Complete Boss of the Blues (Bear Family, 2020)

Selected liner notes

Al Green: Let's Stay Together (Hi Records, 2003 reissue)
Tiny Tim: Tiptoe Through the Tulips: Resurrection (Bear Family, 1988)
Elvis Presley: The Million Dollar Quartet (RCA, 1990)
Harry Belafonte: My Greatest Songs (RCA, 1992)
Gordon Lightfoot: Sunday Concert (Bear Family reissue, 1993)
The Essential Skeeter Davis (RCA, 1996)
The Classic Lena Horne (RCA, 2001)
The Very Best of the Searchers (Sanctuary, 2002)
Sammy Davis, Jr.: My Greatest Songs (Universal, 2003)
The Millennium Collection: The Best of Jimmy Cliff (Universal, 2004)
This Is Reggae Music: The Golden Era 1960-1975 (Trojan Records, 2004)

Awards

Grammy Awards

Tony Awards

Living Blues

International Bluegrass Music Association

Personal life
Escott was born in Boughton Aluph, Kent, England, on 31 August 1949, the son of Lenny, an optician, and Betty Escott. He graduated in 1971 from the University of Kent with a B.A. degree. He has lived in Nashville and Toronto.

References

External links

1949 births
Living people
British music journalists
British musicologists
British biographers
Grammy Award winners
Alumni of the University of Kent